Intimations of Immortality, Op. 29, an ode for tenor, chorus, and orchestra, is one of the best-known works by English composer Gerald Finzi. It is a setting of nine of the eleven stanzas (all but the seventh and eighth) of  William Wordsworth's "Ode: Intimations of Immortality", cast as a single continuous movement of 45 minutes duration. Finzi began composing the work in the late 1930s, but did not complete it until 1950, just before it was performed on 5 September at the Three Choirs Festival in Gloucester Cathedral, with Eric Greene as soloist and Herbert Sumsion conducting.
 
Music critics and historians have pointed out there are obvious stylistic similarities between portions of Intimations and William Walton's  1931 cantata Belshazzar's Feast:

References

Recordings
 Ian Partridge, Guildford Philharmonic Choir & Orchestra, Vernon Handley. Lyrita SRCD.238. 1975, reissued 2007
 Philip Langridge, Royal Liverpool Philharmonic Orchestra and Choir, Richard Hickox. EMI CDC 7 49913 2. 1989, reissued 2001
 James Gilchrist, Bournemouth Symphony Chorus and Orchestra, David Hill. Naxos 8.557863

Choral compositions
Compositions by Gerald Finzi
1950 compositions